Eddisbury could be 

the Eddisbury (UK Parliament constituency) in Cheshire, England
the ancient Eddisbury (hundred) in Cheshire
Eddisbury hill fort in Cheshire
Baron Eddisbury, a title in the Peerage of the United Kingdom